JWH-302 (1-pentyl-3-(3-methoxyphenylacetyl)indole) is an analgesic chemical from the phenylacetylindole family, which acts as a cannabinoid agonist with moderate affinity at both the CB1 and CB2 receptors. It is a positional isomer of the more common drug JWH-250, though it is slightly less potent with a Ki of 17 nM at CB1, compared to 11 nM for JWH-250. Because of their identical molecular weight and similar fragmentation patterns, JWH-302 and JWH-250 can be very difficult to distinguish by GC-MS testing.

In the United States, CB1 receptor agonists of the 3-phenylacetylindole class such as JWH-302 are Schedule I Controlled Substances.

References 

JWH cannabinoids
Phenylacetylindoles
Phenol ethers
CB1 receptor agonists
CB2 receptor agonists